Lord Chedworth, Baron of Chedworth, in the County of Gloucester, was a title in the Peerage of Great Britain. It was created on 12 May 1741 for John Howe, who had earlier represented Wiltshire in Parliament. In 1736 he had succeeded to the estates of his cousin Sir Richard Howe, 2nd Baronet (see Howe Baronets and below). He was succeeded in the barony by his eldest son, John, the second Baron. He served as Lord-Lieutenant of Gloucestershire. He was childless and on his death in 1762 the title passed to his younger brother, Henry, the third Baron. He was unmarried and was succeeded by his nephew, John, the fourth Baron. He was the eldest surviving son of Reverend the Honourable Thomas Howe, younger son of the first Baron. He never married and the title became extinct on his death in 1804.

The first Baron was the son of John Grobham Howe, Paymaster of the Forces, son of John Grobham Howe, younger son of Sir George Grobham Howe, 1st Baronet (see Howe Baronets). Emanuel Scrope Howe and Scrope Howe, 1st Viscount Howe, were his uncles.

Barons Chedworth (1741)
John Howe, 1st Baron Chedworth (d. 1742)
John Thynne Howe, 2nd Baron Chedworth (1714–1762)
Henry Frederick Howe, 3rd Baron Chedworth (1715–1781)
John Howe, 4th Baron Chedworth (1754–1804)

See also
Howe Baronets
Earl Howe

References

Extinct baronies in the Peerage of Great Britain
Noble titles created in 1741